For the wave phenomenon, see sneaker wave.

Seventh Wave may also refer to:

 Seventh Wave (band), a British progressive rock band
 Seventh Wave (Annie Crummer album)
 Seventh Wave (GrimSkunk album)
 Seventh Wave (System 7 album)
 "Seventh Wave", the opening track on Devin Townsend's album Ocean Machine: Biomech
 "Love Is the Seventh Wave", a song on Sting's album The Dream of the Blue Turtles
 A fictional arms dealer group in the video game Black